Instinctual is an album by the American garage house producer Romanthony, with DJ Predator.  It was released by Glasgow Underground Records in 1999.

Track listing
"Mind O' a Predator"
"It's Startin'"
"Remember a Song"
"Clap Ya Handz"
"Handz N d' Air"
"Do You Wanna Dance"
"Music Mind"
"Funky Flava"
"Let's Work (Beatdown)"
"Comin' 4 U"

References

1999 albums
Romanthony albums